Thomas Agerfeldt Olesen (born 1969) is a Danish composer. Olesen studied composition with Poul Ruders Henryk Gorecki Bent Sørensen and Karl Aage Rasmussen.

Works
 Olesen: The Picture of Dorian Gray

References

1969 births
Living people